The 2001 Memorial Cup occurred May 19–27 at the Agridome in Regina, Saskatchewan. It was the 83rd annual Memorial Cup competition and determined the major junior ice hockey champion of the Canadian Hockey League (CHL).  It featured the host team, the Regina Pats as well as the winners of the Ontario Hockey League, Quebec Major Junior Hockey League and the Western Hockey League which were the Ottawa 67's, Val-d'Or Foreurs and the Red Deer Rebels respectively. The Red Deer Rebels won their first Memorial Cup, beating the Val-d'Or Foreurs in the final.

Round-robin standings

Scores
Round Robin
May 19 Ottawa 5, Regina 2
May 20 Red Deer 5, Val d'Or 4 (OT)
May 21 Val d'Or 5, Regina 2
May 22 Red Deer 4, Ottawa 2
May 23 Val d'Or 6, Ottawa 1
May 24 Regina 5, Red Deer 2

Tie-breaker
May 25: Regina 5, Ottawa 0

Semi-final
May 26: Val d'Or 5, Regina 4 (OT)

Final
May 27: Red Deer 6, Val d'Or 5 (OT)

Winning roster
Colby Armstrong, Shane Bendera, Andrew Bergen, Martin Erat, Devin Francon, Boyd Gordon, Diarmuid Kelly, Ross Lupaschuk, Doug Lynch, Justin Mapletoft, Derek Meech, Cam Ondrik, Darcy Robinson, Jeff Smith, Shay Stephenson, Joel Stepp, Bryce Thoma, Jim Vandermeer, Kyle Wanvig, Jeff Woywitka. Coach: Brent Sutter

Scoring leaders
Simon Gamache, VDO, (4g 3a) 7p
Brett Lysak, REG, (3g 4a) 7p
Ross Lupaschuk, RD, (2g 5a) 7p
Chris Lyness, VDO, (1g 6a) 7p
Stephane Veilleux, VDO, (3g 3a) 6p
Brandon Reid, VDO, (3g 3a) 6p
Karel Mosovsky, REG, (3g 3a) 6p
Kevin Korol, REG, (3g 3a) 6p
Kyle Wanvig, RD, (2g 4a) 6p
Paul Elliott, REG, (2g 4a) 6p
Martin Erat, RD, (1g 5a) 6p
Eric Fortier, VDO, (1g 5a) 6p

Goaltending leaders
Chad Davidson, REG (2.20 GAA)
Maxime Daigneault, VDO (3.22 GAA)
Shane Bendera, RD (3.91 GAA)
Seamus Kotyk, OTT

Award winners
Stafford Smythe Memorial Trophy (MVP): Kyle Wanvig, Red Deer
George Parsons Trophy (Sportsmanship): Brandon Reid, Val-d'Or
Hap Emms Memorial Trophy (Goaltender): Maxime Daigneault, Val-d'Or
Ed Chynoweth Trophy (Leading Scorer): Simon Gamache, Val-d'Or

All-star team
Goaltender – Maxime Daigneault, Val-d'Or
Defence – Paul Elliott, Regina; Chris Lyness, Val-d'Or & Ross Lupaschuk, Red Deer (tie)
Forward – Brett Lysak, Regina; Simon Gamache, Val-d'Or; Kyle Wanvig, Red Deer

References

External links
 Memorial Cup 
 Canadian Hockey League

Memorial Cup 2001
Ice hockey competitions in Saskatchewan
Memorial Cup 2001
Sports competitions in Regina, Saskatchewan